was a Japanese figure skater. He represented Japan at the 1932 Winter Olympics and World Figure Skating Championships in 1932.

Results

External links
 Figure skating 1932 
 Ryuichi Obitani's profile at Sports Reference.com

1908 births
Year of death missing
Japanese male single skaters
Olympic figure skaters of Japan
Figure skaters at the 1932 Winter Olympics